The Mid-Essex Football League is a football competition based in England. The top division of this league, the Mid-Essex League Premier Division, sits at level 14 of the English football league system and is a feeder to the Essex Olympian Football League. This league has a total of five divisions (Premier and One to Four).

Member clubs 2021–22
Premier Division
Burnham Ramblers Reserves
Hannakins Farm
Harold Wood Athletic 'A'
Haver Town
Mayland Village
Sandon Royals
South Woodham Ferrers United
Southend Rangers
White Notley Reserves

Division One
Basildon Wanderers
Beacon Hill Rovers Reserves
Blackmore
Brentwood Athletic
Fleet
Hutton 'A'
Laindon Republic
Notley
Old Chelmsfordians 'A'
Rayleigh Town 'A'
Stock United

Division Two
Baddow Athletic
Boreham
Brentwood Athletic Reserves
Broomfield
Emerson & Upminster
Felsted Rovers
Harold Hill Reserves
Harold Wood Athletic 'B'
Hutton Development
Santos
 
Division Three
Benfleet Reserves
Chingford Athletic 'A'
Debden Park
Dunmow United
Harold Hill 'A'
Haver Town Reserves
Kenson
South Cestos
Springfield 'A'
United Chelmsford Churches

Division Four
Beaulieu Park
Broomfield Reserves
Dunmow Town Reserves
Emerson & Upminster 'A'
Eversley Athletic
Great Baddow
Pitsea Athletic 'A'
Shenfield 'A'
Southend Rangers Reserves
Southminster United

Division Five
Beaulieu Park Reserves
Durning
Great Baddow Reserves
Great Bradfords Reserves
Kelvedon Social 'A'
Old Chelmsfordians Development
Sandon Royals Reserves
Silver End United Reserves
South Cestos Reserves
Tillingham Athletic
Writtle 'A'

Development Division
AS Rawreth Development
Beacon Hill Rovers 'A'
Black Stones
Chingford Athletic Development
Earls Colne Under-23
Galleywood Hawks
Great Bradfords Development
Hutton Under-21
Ongar Town Development
Rayleigh Town Development
Wakering Sports Development
Woodford Town Under-21

Champions

Premier Division
1908–09 – Heybridge Swifts
1909–10 – Manor Works
1910–11 – Manor Works
1911–12 – Heybridge Swifts
1912–13 – Hoffman Athletic
1921–22 – Hoffman Athletic
1927–28 – Burnham Ramblers
1934–35 – Hoffman Athletic
1937–38 – Hoffman Athletic
1946–47 – Heybridge Swifts
1949–50 – Maldon Town
1954–55 – Burnham Ramblers
1956–57 – Springfield
1957–58 – Springfield
1958–59 – Springfield
1961–62 – Burnham Ramblers
2007–08 – Southminster St. Leonards
2008–09 – Braintree & Bocking United
2009–10 – Braintree & Bocking United
2010–11 – Scotia Billericay
2011–12 – Great Baddow
2012–13 – Great Baddow
2013–14 – Great Baddow
2014–15 – Great Baddow
2015–16 – Pro Essex
2016–17 – Beacon Hill Rovers
2017–18 – Braintree & Bocking United
2018–19 – CT66

Division One
1948–49 – Springfield
1955–56 – Heybridge Swifts
2007–08 – Springfield Rouge
2008–09 – Byfleet Rangers
2009–10 – St Clere's
2010–11 – Scotia Billericay Reserves
2011–12 – Writtle Manor
2012–13 – Tillingham Hotspur
2013–14 – Beacon Hill Rovers
2014–15 – Pro Essex
2015–16 – Pro-Athletic
2016–17 – St Clere's
2017–18 – Brentwood United
2018–19 – CT66 Reserves

Division Two
1907–08 – Hoffman Athletic
1908–09 – Hoffman Athletic
1909–10 – Hoffman Athletic
1912–13 – Billericay Town
1930–31 – Hoffman Athletic
1931–32 – Billericay Town
1932–33 – Billericay Town
1948–49 – Witham Town
2007–08 – Marconi Athletic
2008–09 – Manford Way 'B'
2009–10 – Ferrers Athletic
2010–11 – Manford Way 'B'
2011–12 – Debden Sports 'A'
2012–13 – CT
2013–14 – Dunmow Rhodes
2014–15 – Haver Town
2015–16 – St Clere's
2016–17 – Emeronians
2017–18 – CT66 Reserves
2018–19 – Harold Hill

Division Three
1935–36 – Witham Town
1947–48 – Witham Town
2007–08 – Great Baddow
2008–09 – Battlesbridge
2009–10 – Broomfield
2010–11 – White Hart United
2011–12 – Tillingham Hotspur
2012–13 – Dunmow Rhodes
2013–14 – Great Baddow Reserves
2014–15 – Great Leighs Athletic
2015–16 – Harold Wood Athletic 'B'
2016–17 – Orsett & Thurrock Cricket Club
2017–18 – Old Chelmsfordians 'A'
2018–19 – White Notley Reserves

Division Four
2007–08 – Battlesbridge Reserves
2008–09 – Braintree & Bocking United Reserves
2009–10 – White Hart United
2010–11 – Tillingham Hotspur
2011–12 – Laindon Orient
2012–13 – Great Baddow Reserves
2013–14 – Real Maldon
2014–15 – Felsted Rovers
2015–16 – Elgar Eagles
2016–17 – Writtle 'A'
2017–18 – United Chelmsford Churches Reserves
2018–19 – Haver Town 'A'

Division Five
2007–08 – Little Waltham Reserves
2008–09 – Great Baddow Reserves
2009–10 – St Clere's Reserves
2010–11 – Laindon Orient
2011–12 – Extreme United
2012–13 – Real Maldon
2013–14 – Haver Town 'B'
2014–15 – Rayne United
2015–16 – Royal Oak
2016–17 – Southminster St Leonards Reserves

Division Six
2011–12 – Dunmow
2012–13 – Haver Town
2013–14 – Writtle Reserves
2014–15 – Writtle Manor

References

External links
Mid-Essex Football League on THE FA FULLTIME
Official website

 
Football in Essex
Football leagues in England